Judy Garland Live!, also known as  Judy Takes Broadway, is a live-performance album recorded at the Manhattan Center in New York City on April 26, 1962, for Capitol Records. The night Garland recorded this album she had a bad case of laryngitis and finished only 10 of the 13 scheduled songs that night.

Capitol Records did not release this album due to Garland's laryngitis, although there was a tentative plan for her to remake the LP in a recording studio. Capitol issued the album finally on June 20, 1989, with the title Judy Garland Live!.

Track listing
Tracks 10–14 are from the Capitol Records album Just for Openers.

"Sail Away" – 4:14
"Something's Coming" – 3:33
"Just In Time" – 3:46
"Get Me to the Church on Time" – 2:44
"Never Will I Marry" – 2:33
"Joey, Joey, Joey" – 3:12
"Hey, Look Me Over" – 2:40
"Some People" – 2:34
"The Party's Over" – 4:10
"It's a Good Day" – 2:12
"That's All" – 3:15
"Fly Me to the Moon" – 3:38
"I Wish You Love" – 3:44
"As Long as He Needs Me" – 4:36

References 
 The Judy Garland Online Discography "Judy Garland Live" page

Judy Garland live albums
1962 live albums
Capitol Records live albums